Monk is an American mystery comedy-drama television series created by Andy Breckman and starring Tony Shalhoub as Adrian Monk. It originally ran from 2002 to 2009 and is primarily a police procedural series but also exhibits comic and dramatic tones in its exploration of the main characters' personal lives. The series was produced by Mandeville Films and Touchstone Television in association with Universal Network Television.

The series debuted on July 12, 2002, on USA Network. It continued for eight seasons, with the final season concluding on December 4, 2009. The series held the record for the most-watched scripted drama episode in cable television history from 2009 through 2012 (broken by The Walking Dead) with "Mr. Monk and the End – Part II", its series finale, with 9.4 million viewers, 3.2 million of them in the 18–49 demographic.

The series was critically acclaimed, winning eight Emmy Awards, one Golden Globe Award, and two Screen Actors Guild Awards.

On March 15, 2023, Peacock ordered a Monk follow-up film, titled Mr. Monk's Last Case: A Monk Movie with original cast members Shalhoub, Levine, Howard, Gray-Stanford, Hardin and Elizondo confirmed to reprise their roles from the series with creator Andy Breckman penning the script.

Premise
Adrian Monk, a San Francisco Police Department detective, has a nervous breakdown after his wife, Trudy, is killed by a car bomb, possibly because of her work as a journalist. He loses his job and refuses to leave his house for several years. With the help of his nurse/assistant, Sharona Fleming, he finally is able to leave his house and begins work as a private detective and a consultant for the police, although his obsessive–compulsive disorder, which has worsened since Trudy's death, poses challenges for him and frustration for those around him. Monk also continues to investigate Trudy's death.

Monk's numerous compulsive habits and phobias compound his situation, such as his fear of germs. Monk is afraid of 312 things, including milk, ladybugs, harmonicas, heights, asymmetry, enclosed spaces, foods touching on his plate, messes, and risk. (He has a breakthrough from claustrophobia later in the series.) The OCD and phobias cause problems for Monk and anyone around him as he investigates cases. These same personal struggles, particularly the OCD, are what aid him in solving cases: his sharp memory, specific mindset, and attention to detail.

Captain Leland Stottlemeyer and Lieutenant Randy Disher call on Monk when they have troubles with investigations. Stottlemeyer is often irritated by Monk's behavior, but respects his friend and former colleague's amazing insight and observational abilities, as does Disher. Ever since childhood, Monk's obsessive attention to detail has allowed him to spot tiny discrepancies, find patterns, and make connections that others miss. These insights work both consciously and unconsciously, so often Monk observes something "wrong" but is unable to pinpoint what it is until someone says or does something that triggers his understanding.

In the middle of season three, Sharona decides to remarry her ex-husband and moves back to New Jersey, prompting Monk to hire Natalie Teeger as his new assistant. Natalie is a widow and mother of 11-year-old daughter Julie. Monk discovers Natalie when she is involved in a homicide case, in "Mr. Monk and the Red Herring". Natalie is able to understand and bond with Monk better than most people, largely due to sharing his grief over the loss of a spouse.

Monk has a brother Ambrose and a half-brother, Jack Jr., whom Monk first learns about when his father tells him in season five. He meets Jack Jr. in the episode "Mr. Monk's Other Brother" during season seven.

Characters

Main

Adrian Monk (Tony Shalhoub) is a former homicide detective and a consultant for the San Francisco Police Department.  He has an extreme case of OCD and is well known for his various fears and phobias, including (but certainly not limited to) heights, snakes, crowds, glaciers, rodeos, wind, and milk. His wife Trudy was murdered in 1997, and he is haunted by her death (and the fact that it was unsolved) until the series finale. Her gravestone in that episode says Trudy Anne Monk, 1962-1997.
Sharona Fleming (Bitty Schram; seasons 1–3) is Monk's nurse and later becomes his first assistant. She refuses to baby him, often forcing him to do things that are unpleasant to him. Her final appearance as a regular character is in "Mr. Monk Takes His Medicine". She moves to New Jersey midway through season three, leaving only a note. However, she returns in the final season in "Mr. Monk and Sharona"  to give closure to her character. By "Mr. Monk and the End (Part Two)", she and Randy are revealed to have moved to New Jersey together.
Captain Leland Stottlemeyer (Ted Levine) is the head of the Homicide Division of the San Francisco Police Department.  He and Monk have been good friends since Monk was on the police force, and he continues to be Monk's friend throughout the series. He does his best to help Monk, but is occasionally annoyed by Monk's phobias and the damage they can cause. In the first two seasons, Stottlemeyer is reluctant to work with Monk, seemingly annoyed by the idea that he could not handle his cases himself. By seasons three and four, his faith in Monk's contribution is well-cemented and his collaboration is unquestionable.
Lieutenant Randy Disher (Jason Gray-Stanford) is a lieutenant in the Homicide Division of the SFPD. He is naive and often portrayed as slightly dim. The other characters are often irritated by him, but they also care about him. In season eight, he is seen kissing Sharona and in the series finale, he moves to Summit, New Jersey, where they move in together. He becomes chief of police there.
Natalie Teeger (Traylor Howard; seasons 3–8) is Monk's second and final assistant. Although she is more deferential to her boss than Sharona, referring to him as "Mr. Monk", she is not hesitant about telling him when his eccentricities are going too far. A young widow who lives with her daughter Julie, Natalie lost her husband Mitch when he was shot down over Kosovo in 1998. She first appears in "Mr. Monk and the Red Herring". Natalie was introduced partway through season three when Bitty Schram, who played Sharona, left "precipitous[ly]", reportedly over a contract dispute. Traylor Howard had not yet seen the show and was unenthusiastic about her manager's urgings to audition as Schram's replacement. She nevertheless tried out and got the part. Despite her initial "cool" reception from fans, show co-creator Andy Breckman believes Traylor quickly and successfully filled the void. "I will always be grateful to Traylor because she came in when the show was in crisis and saved our baby […] We had to make a hurried replacement, and not every show survives that. I was scared to death."

Supporting
Julie Teeger (Emmy Clarke) is Natalie's daughter. She first appeared in "Mr. Monk and the Red Herring" and last appeared in "Mr. Monk and the End – Part I". In her final appearance, Julie prepares to attend college to study theater.
Dr. Charles Kroger (Stanley Kamel) is Monk's psychiatrist during the first six seasons of the show. His last appearance is in "Mr. Monk Paints His Masterpiece". His character was said to have died of a heart attack when Monk returned for season seven, after Kamel died of a heart attack on April 8, 2008, between production of seasons six and seven. 
 Dr. Neven Bell (Héctor Elizondo) is Monk's second psychiatrist. He first appears in "Mr. Monk Buys a House". Dr. Bell was introduced in 2008 to replace Dr. Kroger after the death of actor Stanley Kamel.
Trudy Monk (Stellina Rusich in the first and second seasons and Melora Hardin starting in the third season. Younger Trudy is played by Lindy Newton in "Mr. Monk and the Class Reunion".) is Monk's deceased wife. Her husband Monk's attempt to solve her murder is the show's overarching plot arc.
Kevin Dorfman (Jarrad Paul) is an accountant and Monk's talkative and nosy upstairs neighbor. He first appears in the season-two episode "Mr. Monk and the Paperboy". He is murdered by fellow magician Karl Torini in the season-seven episode "Mr. Monk and the Magician".
Harold Krenshaw (Tim Bagley), another patient of Dr. Kroger's, has constant disputes with Monk due to their incompatible obsessions. Harold first appeared in "Mr. Monk and the Girl Who Cried Wolf".
Benjy Fleming (Kane Ritchotte during the pilot episode and seasons two and three, and Max Morrow during the first season) is Sharona's son. His last appearance is in the season-three episode "Mr. Monk and the Employee of the Month".

Episodes

Production
According to an interview with executive producer David Hoberman, ABC first conceived the series as a police show with an Inspector Clouseau-like character with OCD. Hoberman said ABC wanted Michael Richards, who had starred as a private investigator in The Michael Richards Show two years earlier, for the show, but Richards turned it down. Hoberman brought in Andy Breckman as creator, and Breckman, inspired by Sherlock Holmes, introduced Dr. Kroger as a Doctor Watson-like character and an Inspector Lestrade-like character who eventually became Captain Stottlemeyer.

Although ABC originated the show, the network handed it off to the USA Network. USA is now owned by NBC (NBC Universal). Monk was the first ABC Studios-produced show aired on USA Network instead of ABC. Although ABC initially refused Monk, they did air repeats of the show on ABC between June–November 2002, and then again between March–May 2004. On January 12, 2006, USA Network announced that Monk had been picked up through at least season six as one of the "highest-rated series in cable history." An in-joke reference to this contract renewal was also inserted into the episode "Mr. Monk and the Big Reward", which aired around this time.

Season five premiered Friday, July 7, 2006, at 9:00 pm Eastern time. This marked the first time change for the program, which aired at 10:00 pm during its first four seasons. The change allowed the show to work as a lead-in to a new USA Network series, Psych, another offbeat detective program. Monk followed a consistent format of airing half of its 16 episodes in midyear and the second half early the following year, with the exception of the first season, which broadcast entirely from July through October 2002, and the final season, which broadcast entirely between August and December 2009.

Previously aired episodes of Monk began airing on NBC Universal sibling network NBC April 6, 2008. NBC eyed the show because its block with Psych could be plugged into NBC's schedule intact. The shows were being used to increase the scripted programming on the network as production of its own scripted programming ramped back up following the writers' strike. Ratings for the broadcast debut were well below NBC averages for the time period. The show came in third behind Big Brother 9 on CBS and Oprah's Big Give on ABC.

Location
Although set in the San Francisco Bay Area, Monk is for the most part shot elsewhere except for occasional exteriors featuring city landmarks. The pilot episode was shot in Vancouver, British Columbia, with some location shooting in San Francisco, and the subsequent season-one episodes were shot in the Toronto, Ontario area. Most of the episodes from seasons two through six were filmed in the Los Angeles area. These include the sets for Monk's apartment, the police station and Stottlemeyer's office, Dr. Kroger's office, and Natalie's house. In season two, episode eight, a building for the Toronto Star can also be seen in a cut scene.

In the later part of season four,  some on-location filming was done in San Francisco. Many portions of the episode "Mr. Monk and the Big Reward" were noticeably shot on location, including a climactic chase scene where Monk and Natalie are chased by three bounty hunters. Other filming was done in Chinatown, which is shown in the opening of "Mr. Monk Gets Jury Duty", as Stottlemeyer and Disher chase wanted fugitive Miguel Escobar (Carlos Gomez) up Jackson Street. In "Mr. Monk and the Astronaut", some on-location filming was done at Edwards Air Force Base.

Theme music
During the first season of Monk, the series used a jazzy instrumental introduction to the show by songwriter Jeff Beal, performed by guitarist Grant Geissman. The theme won the 2003 Emmy Award for Best Main Title Music.

NYC actor Colter Rule was hired by USA Network to do all radio and TV promotions for the series from its inception, lending an ironic, understated tone that contributed to the show's early popularity. The original tag was "Monk! America's Favorite Defective Detective!"  When season two began, the series received a new theme song, titled "It's a Jungle Out There", by Randy Newman. Reaction to the new theme was mixed. A review of season two in the New York Daily News included a wish that producers would revert to the original theme.  Shalhoub expressed his support for the new theme in USA Today, saying its "dark and mournful sound,… [its] tongue-in-cheek, darkly humorous side… completely fits the tone of the show."  Newman was awarded the 2004 Emmy Award for Best Main Title Music for "It's a Jungle Out There".

The show made references to the theme music controversy in the episode "Mr. Monk and the TV Star", where obsessed fan Marci Maven and Sharona both express distaste for the new theme music to a CSI parody called Crime Lab: SF. In the epilogue of the story, Marci implores Monk to promise her that he will never change the theme music if he ever gets his own show. When Monk agrees to the promise, the original music is heard as the scene fades to credits, and it plays through the credits.

The original theme is heard in the season-three episode "Mr. Monk and the Game Show". It is heard in several other episodes as the show enters the credits and then leads into the new theme's instrumental version. In the season-five episode "Mr. Monk and the Leper", while looking around a victim's apartment, Randy doodles out the old theme song on the piano, much to Stottlemeyer's exasperation. The music is also heard in the season-seven episode "Mr. Monk and the Bully".

In the season-six episode "Mr. Monk and the Rapper", Snoop Dogg guest-starred as Murderuss, a rapper who is being wrongly accused of car-bombing a rival rapper. For the episode, Snoop Dogg performed a hip-hop cover of "It's a Jungle Out There" that substitutes for Randy Newman's version in the opening credits, and at the end before transitioning into the regular credit music. The June 16, 2008, reairing of the pilot episode featured a new credit sequence with the Newman theme. The season-eight episode "Happy Birthday, Mr. Monk" features a slower version of the original theme with a muted trumpet playing the melody.

Randy Newman also wrote a new song for the final episode entitled "When I'm Gone". The song was released on iTunes on December 1, 2009, and won the 2010 Emmy Award for Outstanding Original Music and Lyrics.

For a few episodes where Trudy is featured, a somber but pleasant ending theme was used.  The ending theme is last used in "Mr. Monk vs. the Cobra".

"Here's what happened" segments
Most episodes feature a sequence in which Monk reveals how the crime was committed, almost always prefaced with the words "Here's what happened" and shown in black and white. Sometimes the conventions of these segments are defied for humorous effect, e.g. by having them take place early in the episode or being delivered by someone other than Monk.

Syndication
Over the years, the show was syndicated on MyNetworkTV from 2010 to 2014. Other networks include Ion Television, WE tv, Sundance, Cozi TV on October 3, 2022 and Hallmark Movies and Mysteries from March 11, 2017.

Reception

The series was given many awards and nominations, including winning eight Emmy Awards, one Golden Globe Award, and two Screen Actors Guild Awards.

Turkish adaptation 
A Turkish adaptation titled Galip Derviş began airing on Kanal D in March 2013, the same name used when they first aired the original Monk in the 2000s.

Other media

Little Monk

USA Network premiered a 10-episode online series entitled "Little Monk" on August 21, 2009. It includes Adrian and Ambrose Monk during their middle-school years, bringing a back story to Monk's detective skills and phobias.

Scrapped television movie 
On February 17, 2012, Andy Breckman announced that a script had been completed for a television movie titled Mr. Monk For Mayor. Breckman stated that the film should begin production by June–August 2012 in California for a release date in December 2012. Breckman also stated that he hoped a sequel would be produced, as well.  The idea was rejected for budgetary reasons.

COVID-19 short
On May 11, 2020, Peacock, for their At-Home Variety Show released a 7-minute scripted short of Monk, titled Mr. Monk Shelters in Place, following Monk during the COVID-19 pandemic, showing how he fares during this time. Tony Shalhoub reprises the titular role, as well as original main cast members: Jason Gray-Stanford, Ted Levine, and Traylor Howard in their respective characters.

Movie
On March 14, 2023, Tony Shalhoub confirmed on Dr. Loubna Hassanieh's Unheard Stories: Stories That Inspire podcast that a 90-minute Monk movie will be produced for Peacock, with shooting expected to start in May 2023. The following day, Peacock officially ordered the Monk follow-up film, titled Mr. Monk's Last Case: A Monk Movie with original cast members Shalhoub, Levine, Howard, Gray-Stanford, Hardin and Elizondo confirmed to reprise their roles from the series with creator Andy Breckman penning the script.

Soundtrack
The show's soundtrack features its original music score, composed by Jeff Beal.

Podcast
A "behind-the-scenes" audio podcast entitled "Lunch at Monk" is available for download through the USA website. In the podcast, cast and crew members of the show are interviewed over lunch and dinner.

Novel series
Since 2006, during the airing of season four, Lee Goldberg, a writer for the series, has produced a series of novels based on the original television series. All of the novels are narrated by Natalie Teeger, Monk's second assistant. For the most part, the novels remain faithful to the television series, with slight discontinuity. On December 31, 2012, the last novel to be written by Lee Goldberg was released. After Goldberg left the series, Hy Conrad wrote four more books, ending with Mr. Monk and the New Lieutenant.

Home releases
Universal Studios Home Entertainment has released all eight seasons of Monk on DVD in Region 1. On October 5, 2010, Universal released Monk – The Complete Series: Limited edition boxset on DVD in Region 1, a 32-disc set featuring all eight seasons of the series, as well as special features and a collectible 32-page booklet.

Monk episodes are also available on iTunes. All seasons are also available in HD format. The Region 2 and Region 4 DVDs of seasons one-three are in the 4:3 aspect ratio.

In Australia, Seasons 1-5 were re-released in slimmer packaging in 2010. In 2017, all eight seasons were re-issued and distributed by Shock Entertainment (previous releases were Universal). Seasons 1-3 are now in 16:9 format, and all seasons are Region 4 NTSC (previous releases were PAL Regions 2, 4 and 5). Complaints from some buyers were that there are no subtitles or episode list and episodes appearing out of order.

All 125 episodes (seasons 1–8) of the series are available on various streaming services including Peacock, Amazon Prime, and YouTube TV.

References

External links

 Official website
 Monk on USA from the TV Guide website
 
 

 
2000s American comedy-drama television series
2000s American crime drama television series
2000s American mystery television series
2000s American police procedural television series
2002 American television series debuts
2009 American television series endings
American crime comedy television series
American detective television series
English-language television shows
Fictional portrayals of the San Francisco Police Department
Murder in television
Obsessive–compulsive disorder in fiction
Primetime Emmy Award-winning television series
Television shows adapted into novels
Television series by ABC Studios
Television series by Universal Television
Television series created by Andy Breckman
Television shows set in San Francisco
Television series by Universal Content Productions
USA Network original programming